Əlimərdanlı (also, Alimardanly) is a village and municipality in the Tovuz Rayon of Azerbaijan.  It has a population of 3,060.

Notable natives 

 Mardan Musayev — Hero of the Soviet Union.

References 

Populated places in Tovuz District